Parent article: List of comic strips; Siblings: A–F • G–O • P–Z

P 
 Pääkaupunki (1997– ) by Tarmo Koivisto (Finland)
 Padded Cell (1915–1918) by A. E. Hayward (US)
 The Pajama Diaries (2006–2020) by Terri Libenson (US)
 Pam (1929–1942) by A. W. Brewerton and later S. L. Huntley
 Panda (1946–1991) by Marten Toonder (NL)
 Pardon Our Planet (1996– ), first titled I Need Help, then Pardon My Planet, by Vic Lee (US)
 Pa's Son-in-Law (1924–1941) by Charles H. Wellington
 Patrick (1965–1969) by Malcolm Hancock (US)
 Patsy (see The Adventures of Patsy)
 Pauline McPeril (1966–1969) by Jack Rickard and Mell Lazarus (US)
 Paul Temple (1951–1971) by Francis Durbridge, Alfred Sindall, Bill Bailey and John McNamara (UK)
 Pavlov (1979– ) by Ted Martin
 PC & Pixel (1998– ) by Tak Bui (CAN)
 Peaches, Queen of the Universe, see Eyebeam
 Peanuts (1950–2000) by Charles M. Schulz (US)
 Pearls Before Swine (1999– ) by Stephan Pastis (US)
 Pee Wee (1938–1986) nominally by Jerry Iger
 Pee Wee Harris (1952– ) from Percy Keese Fitzhugh's 1915 series, drawn by Alfred B. Stenzel, then Mike Adair
 Peggy (1946–1960) by Chuck Thurston, and later Art Sansom, Marilyn Troyer, and Elmarine Howard
 Penmen (1996– ) by Gary Blehm (US) – webcomic since 2001
 Penny (1943–1970) by Harry Haenigsen (US)
 Pep (2008–2009) by Curtis Kilfoy
 Percy and Ferdie (1906–1924), first titled The Hall-Room Boys, by H. A. MacGill
 The Perishers (1958–2006) originally by Dennis Collins and Maurice Dodd (UK)
 The Perils of Submarine Boating by C. W. Kahles
 Perkins (1969–1980) by John Miles
 Perky & Beanz (1985–1987) by Russell Myers (US)
 Perry Mason (1950–1952) by Mel Keefer and Charles Lofgren (US)
 The Pet Set (1977–1978) by Doug Borgstedt and Jean Borgstedt
 Peter Panic (1973– ) by Lo Linkert
 Peter Piltdown (1935–1946) by Mel Eaton
 Peter Rabbit (1924–1955) by Harrison Cady, and others later, including Vincent Fago
 Peter Scratch (1965–1967) by Lou Fine (US)
 Pete the Tramp (1933–1963) by Clarence D. Russell
 Petey Dink, first named Gink and Dink (1908–1930) by Charles Voight (US)
 Petting Patty (1929–1930) by Jefferson Machamer
 The Phantom (1936– ) originally by Lee Falk and Ray Moore, currently by Tony DePaul and Mike Manley (US)
 Phil Fumble (1932–1938) by Ernie Bushmiller (US)
 Phillip's Flock (1968–1985) by Doc Goodwin
 Phoebe and Her Unicorn (2012– ) by Dana Simpson (originally a webcomic called Heavenly Nostrils before moving to the newspapers in 2015)
 Phoebe's Place (1990–1991) by Bill Schorr (US)
 Pickles (1990– ) by Brian Crane (US)
 Pic-Trix by (1947–1958) by Morrie Brickman
 Pier-Oddities (1953–1962) by Johnny Pierotti
 Pigeon Culture (2011– ) unattributed (US)
 Pigtails (~1921–1923) by Mildred Burleigh (US)
 Pip, Squeak and Wilfred (1919–1955) by Bertram Lamb and Austin Payne (UK)
 Piranha Club (1988–2018), first titled Ernie, by Bud Grace (US)
 PIXies (1966–1987) by Jack Wohl
 Plain Jane (1969–1974) by Frank Baginski (US)
 Play-Funnies (1963–1973) not attributed initially, later by Becky
 Pluggers (1993– ) by Gary Brookins; originally by Jeff MacNelly (US)
 Pluribus (1971–1973) by Bill Rechin (US)
 Pocket Cartoons (1946–1957) by Ajay, Cull, Churchill, Phillips, and later Bert Lancaster
 Pogo (1948–1975, 1989–1993) originally by Walt Kelly (US)
 The Politician by David Fletcher
 Polly and Her Pals (1912–1958), first titled Positive Polly, by Cliff Sterrett (US)
 Pondus (1996– ) by Frode Øverli (Norway)
 Ponytail (1961–1988) by Lee Holley
 Pooch Café (2001– ) by Paul Gilligan (Canada)
 Poor Arnold's Almanac (1959–61, 1989–90) by Arnold Roth (US)
 Poor Pa (1927–1955) by Claude Callan and later Robert Quillen
 Pop (1921–1960) originally by John Millar Watt (UK)
 Popeye (Thimble Theatre) (1929– ) originally by E.C. Segar (US)
 Pops (1962–1978) by George Wolfe
 Pop's Place (1986–2001) by Sam C. Rawls
 Pot-Shots (1975– ) by Ashleigh Brilliant
 The Potts (1920– ), first titled You and Me, originally by Stan Cross (Australia)
 Pottsy (1958–1972) by Jay Irving
 PreTeena (2001–2008), by Allison Barrows (US)
 Prickly City (2004– ) by Scott Stantis (US)
 Prince (1986) by Winthrop Prince (US)
 Prince of the Palace (1980s–2000s) by Mike Atkinson (UK – Daily Record (Scotland) newspaper)
 Prince Valiant (1937– ) originally by Hal Foster (US)
 Priscilla's Pop (1946–1983) by Al Vermeer, and later Edmund R. "Ed" Sullivan (US)
 Professor Doodle's (1987– ) by Steve Sack and Craig MacIntosh
 Professor Phumble (1960–1978) by Bill Yates
 Professor Pi (1959–1972) by V. T. Born and later George O. Swanson
 Pssst (1977– ) by J. Maddox
 Pud (1984– ) by Steve Nease (Canada)
 Puffy the Pig (1930–c.1935) originally by Don Flowers
 Pugad Baboy (1988– ) by Apolonio Medina Jr. (Philippines)
 Punaniska (1990s) by Harri Vaalio (Finland)
 Pussycat Princess (1935–1946) by Grace Drayton and Ed Anthony, and later Ruth Carroll
 Psycops (1995–1999) by Pete Nash, John Cooper and John M Burns. (UK)

Q 
 Quality Time (1991–1998) by Gail Machlis
 Queen of the Universe, see Eyebeam
 Queenie (1966–1985) by Phil Interlandi
 Queens Counsel (1993– ) by Graham Francis Defries and Alexander Williams (UK)
 The Quigmans (1986–2011) by Buddy Hickerson (US)
 Quincy (1970–1986) by Ted Shearer (US)

R 
 Radio Patrol (1934–1950) by Charlie Schmidt and Ed Sullivan
 Radio Raymond (1924) by V. R. Shoemaker
 Raising Duncan (2000–2005) by Chris Browne (US)
 Rasmus Klump (1951–1992) in English entitled Bruin and Barnaby Bear, by C. & V. Hansen (Denmark)
 Real Life Adventures (1991– ) by Lance Aldrich and Gary Wise (US)
 Reality Check (1995– ) by Dave Whamond (US)
 Red and Rover (2000– ) by Brian Basset (US)
 Red Barry (1934–1939) by Will Gould
 Red Knight (1940–1943) by John Welch and Jack McGuire (US)
 Red Meat (1989– ) by Max Cannon (US)
 Red Oasis (2007– ) by multiple authors (US)
 Red Ryder (1938–1964) by Fred Harman (US)
 Redeye (1967–2008) by Gordon Bess, and later Bill Yates and Mel Casson (US)
 Reg'lar Fellers (1917–1949) by Gene Byrnes (US)
 Retail (2006– ) by Norm Feuti (US)
 Retro Geek (2008) by Steve Dickenson and Todd Clark (US)
 Rex Morgan, M.D. (1948– ) created by Nicholas P. Dallis (US)
 Reynolds Unwrapped (1989– ) created by Dan Reynolds (US)
 Rhymes With Orange (1994– ) by Hilary Price (US)
 Ribbons and Haywire (1982–1985) by Steve Carpenter and Ed Wallerstein (US)
 Rick Kane, Space Marshal (1951) by Walter Gibson and Elmer Stoner (US)
 Rick O'Shay (1958–1981) originally by Stan Lynde (US)
 Right Around Home (1938–1964), later entitled Right Around Home with Myrtle, by Dudley Fisher, and later Bob Vittur
 Rink Brody (1946) by H. D. Williams (US)
 Rip Kirby (1946–1999) originally by Alex Raymond (US)
 Ripley's Believe It or Not (1918– ) originally by Robert Ripley (US)
 The Ripples (see The Neighbors)
 Rip Tide (1959–1970) by Grandetti and Ed Herron
 Rivets (1953–1988) by George Sixta
 Robin Malone (1967–1970) by Bob Lubbers
 Robotman (see Monty)
 Rocky (1998– ) by Martin Kellerman (Sweden)
 Rocky the Stone-Age Kid (1940–1943) by Frank Engli (US)
 De Rode Ridder (1959– ) by Willy Vandersteen (Belgium)
 Rollo Rollingstone (1930–1933) originally by Bruce Barr
 Romeo Brown (1954–1963) by Alfred Mazure, Peter O'Donnell and Jim Holdaway (UK)
 Romulus of Rome (1961–1963) by Mike Wong and J. P. Cahn (US)
 Ronaldinho Gaucho (2006–c. 2011) by Mauricio de Sousa (Brazil)
 Rooftop O'Toole (1976–1980) by Jerry Fearing and Bill Farmer (US)
 Room and Board (1936–1958) by Gene Ahern (US)
 Rose Is Rose (1983– ) by Pat Brady (US)
 Rosie's Beau (1930–1943) by George McManus
 Roy Powers, Eagle Scout (c. 1937–1942) by "Paul Powell," Jimmy Thompson, Kemp Starrett, and Charles Coll (US)
 Roy Rogers (1949–1961) by Charles McKimson (US)
 Rubes (1986– ) by Leigh Rubin
 Rudy (1983–1985) by William Overgard (US)
 Rudy Park (2001– ) by Darrin Bell and Theron Heir (US)
 Rufus M'Goofus (1922–1924) by Joe Cunningham (US)
 Ruggles (1935–1957) by Steve Dowling (UK)
 Rugrats (2000–2005) nominally by Nickelodeon (US)
 Running on Empty (2003– ) by Dan Beadle (US)
 Rupert Bear (1920– ) originally by Mary Tourtel (UK)
 Rural Delivery (1951– ) by Paul Gringle, and later Al Smith
 Rural Route (1959–1967, 1979) by Walter Neil Ball
 Rusty Riley (1948–1959) by Frank Godwin and later Rod Reed
 The Ryatts (1955–1994) by Cal Alley and later Jack Elrod (US)
 Rymy-Eetu (1930–1970s) by Erkki Tanttu (Finland)

S 
 Sad Sack (1946–1958) by George Baker
 Safe Havens (1988– ) by Bill Holbrook (US)
 The Saint (1948–1962) originally by Leslie Charteris and Mike Roy (US)
 Salesman Sam (1925–1936) by George O. Swanson, and later Charles D. Small and Gladys Parker
 Sally Bananas (1969–1973) by Charles Barsotti (US)
 Sally Forth (1968–1974) by Wally Wood (US)
 Sally Forth (1982– ) by Francesco Marciuliano and Jim Keefe; originally by Greg Howard (US)
 Sally's Sallies (1927–1966) by R. J. Scott
 Salt Chuck (1988– ) by Chuck Sharman
 Sam and Silo (1977– ) by Jerry Dumas and Mort Walker (US)
 Sam's Strip (1961–1963) by Jerry Dumas and Mort Walker (US)
 Sandy (1962–1989) by June Unwin, and later George W. Crane and Jim Unwin
 Sandy Highflyer, the Airship Man by C. W. Kahles
 Sappo (1924–1945) by E. C. Segar, and later Tom Sims and Bill Zaboly
 Sazae-san (1946–1974) by Machiko Hasegawa (Japan)
 Scamp (1955–1988) nominally by Walt Disney (US)
 Scarth A.D. 2195 (1969–circa 1974) by Luis Roca and Jo Addams (UK)
 Scary Gary (2008– ) by Mark Buford
 School Days (1917–1932) by Clare Victor Dwiggins (US)
 Scorchy Smith (1930–1961) originally by John Terry (US)
 Scorer (1989–2011) by Barrie Tomlinson, David Sque and David Pugh (UK)
 Screen Girl (1945–1948) by Jim Pabian
 Scroll of Fame (1951–1961) by Arthur S. Curtis
 Scroogie (1975–1976) by Tug McGraw and Mike Witte (US)
 Sea Rations (1974) by Jim Estes
 Second Chances (1997–2000) by Jeff Millar and Bill Hinds (US)
 Secret Agent X-9 (1934–1996), also titled Secret Agent Corrigan, originally by Dashiell Hammett and Alex Raymond (US)
 Secret Asian Man (2007– ) by Tak Toyoshima (US)
 See for Yourself (1946) by George Wunder (US)
 The Seekers (1966–1971) by John M. Burns, Les Lilley, Phillip Douglas and Dick O’Neil (UK)
 Seems Like Yesterday (1939–1947), also titled Home Town Echoes, by Camillus Kesler
 Selling Short (1975–1987) by Don Raden and Ken Ross
 Senator Caucus (1959–1968) by George Levine, and later Pete Wyma
 Sennin Buraku (1956– ) by Kō Kojima (Japan)
 Sentinel Louie (1934–1943) by Otto Soglow
 Service Smiles (1956–1958) by Art Gates (US)
 Seven-O-Heaven (2009– ) by Andrew Goff and Will Startare
 Seventeen (1956–1973) by Arthur Erenberg and Bernie Lansky
 The Shadow (1940–1942) by Walter B. Gibson and Vernon Greene (US)
 Sherlock Holmes (1954–1955) by Edith Meiser and Frank Giacoia (US)
 Sherman on the Mount (1986–1988) by Walt Lee and Michael Fruchey (US)
 Sherman's Alley (1992–1996) by Toby Gibbs and Jerry Voigt (US)
 Sherman's Lagoon (1991– ) by Jim Toomey (US)
 Shirley and Son (2000–2003) by Jerry Bittle (US)
 Shoe (1977– ) originally by Jeff MacNelly (US)
 Shoecabbage (2001– ) by Teresa Burritt and David Stanford (US)
 Shopping Around (1960–1963) by Rolfe Mason
 Short Ribs (1958–1982) by Frank O'Neal, and later Frank Hill (US)
 Shuggie and Duggie (1990s– ) by Bullimore and Anderson (Daily Record (Scotland)) (UK)
 Sibling Revelry (1989–1995) by Man Martin (US)
 Side Glances (1929–1985) by George Clark, and later Gill Fox (US)
 Sign-O-Rama (1970–1979) by M. W. Martin
 Sigmund (1994–...) by Peter de Wit (Netherlands). 
 Silent Sam (1920–1945) originally Adamson, by Oscar Jacobsson (Sweden)
 Silly Milly (1938–1951) by Stan MacGovern
 Silly Philly (1947–1960) by Bil Keane (US)
 Silly Symphony (1932–1945) originally by Earl Duvall and Al Taliaferro (US)
 Simon's Cat (2011–2013) by Simon Tofield (UK)
 Simpkins (1971–1980) originally by George Crenshaw (US)
 S1NGLE (2001– ) by Hanco Kolk and Peter de Wit (Netherlands)
 Single and Looking, formerly Out of the Gene Pool (2002–2008) by Matt Janz (US)
 Single Slices (1987–2001) by Peter Kohlsaat (US)
 Sir Bagby (1959–1965) by Rick Hackney and Bill Hackney (US)
 Six Chix (2000– ) by Isabella Bannerman, Margaret Shulock, Rina Piccolo, Anne Gibbons, Kathryn LeMieux, and Stephanie Piro (US)
 Skeets (1932–1951) by Dow O. Walling
 Skippy (1923–1945) by Percy Crosby (US)
 Sky Masters (1958–1961) by Jack Kirby, Wally Wood, Dick and Dave Wood (US)
 Skyroads (1930–1943) by Lester J. Maitland, and later Dick Calkins, Russell Keaton, and William Winston
 Slim Jim (1924–1942) by Stanley E. Armstrong and others later
 Slow Wave (1995– ) by Jesse Reklaw (US)
 Slowpoke (1998– ) by Jen Sorensen (US)
 Slylock Fox (1987– ) by Bob Weber Jr. (US)
 Small Fry Diary (1961–1975) by Nonnee Coan
 Small Saves (2000– ) by J. DeMarco (US)
 the small society (1966–1999) by Morrie Brickman and later Bill Yates
 Small Talk (1955–1964) by Samuel R. Gornbein; (1972) by Becky; (1983– ) by Allen H. Kelly, Jr.
 Smart Alex (1995–1996) by Charlie Podrebarac (US)
 Smart Chart (1970–1983) by Herb Stansbury
 SMALL (2021–) by Max/Small studio1104 (Taiwan)
 S'Matter Pop? (1910–1940) by C. M. Payne (US)
 Smidgens (1962–1974) by Bob Cordray (US)
 Smiles (1924–1939) by Frank Chapman and various others later
 Smilin' Jack (see The Adventures of Smilin' Jack)
 The Smith Family (1951–1994) by Virginia Smith, George Smith, and later Robert Baldwin
 Smitty (1922–1973) by Walter Berndt (US)
 Smokey Stover (1935–1973) by Bill Holman (US)
 The Smythes (1930–1936) by Rea Irvin (US)
 SNAFU (see Beattie Blvd.)
 Snake Tales (1974– ) by Sols (Allan Salisbury) (Australia)
 Sniffy (1964–1973) by George Fett
 Snoodles (1913–1925) by Cy Hungerford
 Snoopy (see Peanuts)
 Snuffy Smith (see Barney Google and Snuffy Smith)
 Somebody's Stenog (1918–1941) by A. E. Hayward, and later Ray Thompson, various others, and Sam Nichols
 Sonny Boy (1982– ) by Bill Murray
 Sonny Pew (1984) by Jim Estes
 Sonny South (1953–1972) by Court Alderson
 Sonnysayings (1926–1939) by Fanny Cory
 The Sons of Liberty (1975– ) by Richard Lynn
 Soup to Nutz (2000– ) by Rick Stromoski (US)
 Sovereign State of Affairs (1976– ) by Wood and R. David Boyd
 Space Moose (1989–1999) by Adam Thrasher (Canada)
 The Spacers (1978–1992) by Emil V. Abrahamian
 Sparks (1952–1967) by Willis Forbes
 Sparky (1953–1966) by Mel Casson
 Sparky Watts (1940–1942) by Boody Rogers
 Speck the Altar Boy (see An Altar Boy Named Speck)
 Speed Bump (1994– ) by Dave Coverly (US)
 Speed Walker, Private Eye (1972?–?) by Cris Hammond (US)
 Spence Easley, first titled Dolly Burns (1928–1935, 1949–1941) by Jack Patton (US)
 Spider-Man (The Amazing Spider-Man) (1977– ) by Stan Lee and Larry Lieber (US)
 The Spirit (1940–1952) by Will Eisner (US)
 Spooky (1935–1971) by Bill Holman
 Spooner (2000–2002) by Ted Dawson (US)
 Sport Slants (1942–1955) by Tom Paprocki (US)
 Sports Cartoon (1940–1967) by Tom Paprocki
 The Sports File (1978– ) by Emil V. Abrahamian
 Sport Side-Lights (c. 1920–c. 1930s) by Jack Sords (US)
 Spot the Frog (2004–2008) by Mark Heath (US)
 Spur Line (1954–1955) by Bud Sagendorf
 Squeegee (1980– ) by Ken Muse
 Stacy (1981– ) by Randy Bisson
 Stampede (1974– ) by Jerry Palen
 Starbirds (1995–1996) by Graham Hey (UK)
 Star Hawks (1977–1981) originally by Gil Kane and Ron Goulart (US)
 Star Trek (1979–1982) originally by Thomas Warkentin (US)
 Star Wars (1979–1984) originally by Russ Manning (US)
 Stark Impressions by Bruce Stark (US)
  (1982– ) by Carsten Graabaek (Denmark)
 Stees Sees (1958–1969) by John Stees
 Steve Canyon (1947–1988) by Milton Caniff (US)
 Steve Roper and Mike Nomad (1936–2004), first titled Big Chief Wahoo, originally by Allen Saunders and Elmer Woggon (US)
 Still Life by Jerry Robinson (US)
 Stoker the Broker (1960–1985) by Henry Boltinoff (US)
 Stone Soup (1995–2020) by Jan Eliot (US)
 The Story of Martha Wayne (1953–1962) by Wilson Scruggs
 Strange As It Seems (1928–1970) by John Hix, and later Ernest Hix, Elsie Hix, Ernest Hix Jr., and Phyllis Hix
 Strange Brew by John Deering
 The Strange World of Mr. Mum (1958–1974) by Irving Phillips (US)
 Streaky (1933–1935) by Gus Edson (US)
 Streamer Kelly (1940–1943, 1946–1950) by Jack Ryan (US)
 Strictly Business (1941–1984) by Dale McFeatters (US)
 Strictly Private, later Peter Plink (1940–1948) by Quin Hall
 Strictly Richter (1945–1963) by Mischa Richter
 Striker 3D (The Sun) by Pete Nash (1985– ) (UK)
 Striptease (2000– ) by Chris Daily
 Student Ghetto (1996–2000) by Adam Miller (US)
 Stumpy Stumbler (1983– ) by Emil V. Abrahamian
 Sturmtruppen (1969–1995) originally by Bonvi (Franco Bonvicini) (Italy)
 Suburbia (1976–1985) by Don Raden
 Such Is Life (1928–1939) by Walt Munson, and later Charles Sughroe, Bo Brown and Kemp Starrett
 Sue to Lou (1928–1938) by Clarence R. Gettier
 Sugar (1949–1961) by Jack Fitch; (1975– ) by Robert L. Gill
 Sunday Laughs Male Cartoons (1980–1993) by Paul Swede
 Sunflower Street (1935–1949) by Tom Little and Tom Sims
 Sunny Sue (1950–1961) by Edna Markham and later Jack Fitch
 The Sunshine Club (2003–2007) by Howie Schneider (US)
 Superandom (2009– ) by Nathan Bowler (Canada)
 Superman (1939–1966) originally by Jerry Siegel and Joe Shuster (US)
 Supernatural Law (1979– ), originally Wolff and Byrd, Counselors of the Macabre, by Batton Lash.
 Susie Q. Smith (1945–1959) by Linda Walter and Jerry Walter
 Suske en Wiske (1945– ), titled Spike and Suzy or Willy and Wanda in English, originally by Willy Vandersteen (Belgium)

 Swamp (1981– ) by Gary Clark (Australia)
 Swamp Brats (1981– ) by Warren Sattler
 Sweeney & Son (1934–1960) by Al Posen
 Sweetie Pie (1954–1967) by Nadine Seltzer
 Sydney (1985–1986) by Scott Stantis (US)
 Sykes’ Cartoons (1925–1941) by Bill Sykes
 Sylvia (1978–2012) by Nicole Hollander (US)

 T 
 Tailspin Tommy (1928–1942) by Glen Chaffin and Hal Forrest (US)
 Tales from the Great Book (1954–1972) by John Lehti
 Tales of the Green Beret (1965–1968) originally by Robin Moore, Joe Kubert and Howard Liss (US)
 Tank McNamara (1974– ) by Jeff Millar and Bill Hinds (US)
 Tar Pit (1993–1994) by Steve Dickenson (US)
 Tarzan (1929–2002) originally by Hal Foster, later by Burne Hogarth, Russ Manning, and others (US)
 Tee Vee Laughs (1975–1985), also known as TV Laffs, by Cliff Rogerson and others
 Teech (1983– ) by Aaron Bacall
 Teena (1945–1963) by Hilda Terry
 Teenage Mum (1994–1996) by Graham Hey (UK)
 Teenage Mutant Ninja Turtles (1990–1997) (US)
 The Teenie Weenies (1924, 1934, 1941–1970) by William Donahey
 Tell It Like It Is (see Dunagin's People)
 The Tenderloiner (1947–1961) by Jack Fitch
 The Terrors of the Tiny Tads (1905–1914) by Gustave Verbeek (US)
 Terry and the Pirates (1934–1973) originally by Milton Caniff (US); (1995) by Michael Uslan and the Brothers Hildebrandt
 Tex Austin (1949–1950) originally by Sam Robins & Tom Fanning (US)
 Tex Benson (1980–1989) originally by Chuck Roblin
 Texas Slim and Dirty Dalton (1925–1958) by Ferd Johnson (US)
 Thatch (1994–1998) by Jeff Shesol (US)
 That Little Game (1917–1927) by Bert Link
 That'll Be the Day (1951–1962) by Fritz Wilkinson
 That's Jake (1986–ended) by Jake Vest
 That's Life (1999–2005) by Mark Twohy (US)
 That's Not the Half of It by Elmer Messner (1926–1927)
 Then – Now (1952–1971) by Fred Fox
 Theophilus (1966–2002) by Bob West (US)
 There Oughta Be a Law! (1944–1984) by Al Fagaly and Harry Shorten, and later Frank Borth, Warren Whipple and Mort Gerberg (US)
 These Women (1946–1963) by Gregory D’Alessio
 They'll Do It Every Time (1929–2008) originally by Jimmy Hatlo (US)
 Thimble Theatre (1919–1966), also titled Thimble Theatre starring Popeye , by E. C. Segar (US)
 Things to Come (1942–1954) by Hank Barrow and later Jim Bresnan
 This and That (1945–1958) by various, including Henry Boltinoff
 This Curious World (1931–1951) by William Ferguson and later George Clark
 This Funny World (1944–1985), gag cartoons by Henry Boltinoff, Ted Key, Don Orehek, Mort Walker and others
 This Is Sport? (1958–1978) by Court Alderson
 This Modern World (1990– ) by Tom Tomorrow (US)
 Thorn McBride (1960–1962) by Frank Giacoia and later Mel Keefer
 Those Browns (1976– ) by Bill Murray (www.billmurrays.com)
 Those Were the Days (1951–1983) by Art Beeman
 Tickle Box (1974–1994) by Ted Trogdon
 Ticklers (1945–1960) by George Scarbo
 Tiffany Jones (1964–1972) by Pat Tourret and Jenny Butterworth (UK)
 Tiger (1965–2003) by Bud Blake (US)
 The Tillers (1945–1960) by Les Carroll
 Tillie the Toiler (1921–1959) by Russ Westover and later Bob Gustafson (US)
 Timbertoes (1946– ) by John Gee (cartoonist) by Marileta Robinson and Judith Hunt (1992–2002)
 Time Out! (1936–1984) by Chet Smith and later Jeff Keate
 The Timid Soul (1924–1953) by H. T. Webster (US)
 Timmy (1948–1960) by Howard Sparber
 Tim Tyler's Luck (1928–1996) by Lyman Young (US)
 Tina (1983–1994) by D. Lucas
 Tina's Groove (2002–2017) by Rina Piccolo (Canada–US)
 Tintin (The Adventures of Tintin) (1929–1944) by Hergé (Georges Remi) (Belgium)
 Tiny Sepuku (1997– ) by Ken Cursoe (US)
 Tiny Tim (1932–1958) by Stanley Link
 Tippie (see Cap Stubbs and Tippie)
 Tizzy (1957–1970) by Kate Osann (US)
 Toadstools (1983–1992) by Leonard Bruce and Charles Durck
 Tobias Seicherl (1930–1940) by 
 TOBY, Robot Satan (2008– ) by Corey Pandolph
 Today's Laugh (1948–1973) by Tom Henderson and William King, and later Jeff Machamer, Frank Owen, Rodney de Sarro, Reamer Keller, Jeff Keate, Cathy Joachim, Bill Yates, Joe Zeis and Betty Swords
 Today's World (1932–1957) by David Brown
 Todd the Dinosaur (2001– ) by Patrick Roberts
 Tom and Jerry (1950s–1991) (US)
 Tom Puss (Dutch original Tom Poes) (1941–1986) by Marten Toonder (Netherlands)
 Tom Sawyer and Huck Finn (1918) by Clare Victor Dwiggins (US); see also Dwig's Huckleberry Finn strip from 1940
 Tom the Dancing Bug (1990– ) by Ruben Bolling (US)
 Tom Trick (1951–1969) by Dale Goss, and later Stan Maays and Mary Goss
 Too Much Coffee Man by Shannon Wheeler (US)
 The Toodles (1945–1961) by Betsy Baer and Stanley F. Baer
 Toonerville Folks (1908–1955) by Fontaine Fox (sometimes called Toonerville Trolley) (US)
 Toots and Casper (1918–1956) by Jimmy Murphy (US)
 Top Dog (1918–1956) by created by Lennie Herman (writer) and Warren Kremer (artist) (US)
 Top of the World (1985–1987) by Mark Tonra (US)
 Traveling Light (1959–1968) by Bob Sloane, Jim Weakley, and Shirley Sloane, and later Ron Butler and Peter Porges
 Travels with Farley (see Farley)
 The Treadwells (1974–1979), first titled The New Neighbors, by Bob Bugg (US)
 The Trendy's (1983– ) by Jim Horan
 Trevor! by Piper and Lee (Australia)
 The Tricky Ones (1983–1993) by Magila
 Trim's Arena (1973–1983) by Hal Trim and later Wayne Stayskal
 Triple Take (2005–2007) by Todd Clark and Scott Nickel
 Troubletown (1988– ) by Lloyd Dangle (US)
 Trudy (1963–2005) by Jerry Marcus (US)
 True Life Adventures (1955–1971) nominally by Walt Disney
 Tuffy (1932–1957) by Syd Hoff
 Tug Transom (1954–1968) by Peter O'Donnell and Alfred Sindall (UK)
 Tumbleweeds (1965–2007) by Tom K. Ryan (US)
 Tundra (1992– ) by Chad Carpenter
 The Turners (2004– ) by Eric Turner (US)
 Turning Back the Times (1947–1961) by Jack Winter
 Tutelandia by Tute (2004–present) (Argentina)
 TV Tee-Hees (1957–1975) by Henry Scarpelli
 Twin Earths (1952–1962) by Alden McWilliams and Oskar Lebeck
 Twitch (1973– ) by Howard Rands
 The World's Greatest Superheroes (1978–1985) originally by Martin Pasko (US)

 U 
 The Umbrella Man by John "Dok" Hager
 Uncle Art's Funland (1933– ) by Art Nugent, Jr.
 Uncle Charlie (1959–1978) by Peter Laing
 Uncle Remus and His Tales of Br'er Rabbit (1945–1972) nominally by Walt Disney
 Up Anchor! (1968–1972) by Kreigh Collins (US)
 Up Front (1944–1945) by Bill Mauldin (US)
 The Upside-Downs of Little Lady Lovekins and Old Man Muffaroo (1903–1905) by Gustave Verbeek (US)
 U.S. Acres (1986–1989) by Jim Davis (US)

 V 
 The Van Swaggers (1930–1943) by Russ Westover
 Vanhat herrat (1982–2002) by Pauli Heikkilä and Markku Paretskoi
 Varoomshka (1969–1979) by John Kent
 Vater und Sohn (1934–1937) by E. O. Plauen (Erich Ohser) (Germany)
 Vic Flint (1945–1964) by Ralph Lane and Michael O’Malley, and later Dean Miller, Jay Heavilin, Art Sansom, and Russ Winterbotham
 Video Cartoons (1983– ) by various
 Viewpoint (1949–1953) by Dave Gerard
 Vignettes of Life (1925–1960) by Frank Godwin, and later J. Norman Lynd, Leonard Starr and Harry Weinart
 Viivi & Wagner (1996– ) by Jussi Tuomola (Finland)
 Village Square (1966– ) by Chuck Stiles
 Virgil (1943–1960) by Leonard Kleis

 W 
 Wallace and Gromit (2010– ) by Mychailo Kazybrid (UK)
 Walnut Cove (1991–1999) by Mark Cullum (US)
 Walt Disney's Donald Duck (1983– ) nominally by Walt Disney
 Walt Disney's Mickey Mouse (1983– ) nominally by Walt Disney
 Walt Disney's Treasury of Classic Tales (1952–1987) by various artists, including Jesse Marsh and Jack Kirby (US)
 Wapsi Square (2001– ) by Paul "Pablo" Taylor
 War on Crime (1936–1938) by Frank Godwin and Jimmy Thompson (US)
 Wash Tubbs (1924–1988) by Roy Crane, merged with Captain Easy in 1949 (US)
 Watch Your Head (2006– ) by Cory Thomas (US)
 Wayout (1964–1970) by Ken Muse (US)
 Weather Comics (1946–1970) by George Scarbo
 Webster Classics (1954–1980) by H. T. Webster
 Wee Pals (1965–2014) by Morrie Turner (US)
 Wee Willie Winkie's World (1906–1907) by Lyonel Feininger (US)
 Wee Women (1957–1994) by Mell Lazarus and later Jim Whiting (US)
 Welcome To The Jungle (2007– ) by Michael Pohrer (US)
 Werebears and Only Children (2007–2010) by Jennifer Barrett (CA)
 Wes Slade (1960–1982) by George Stokes (UK)
 What a Guy! (1987–1996) by Bill Hoest and later Bunny Hoest (US)
 When I Was Short (1989–1992) by Michael Fry and Guy Vasilovich (US)
 Where I'm Coming From (1989–2004) by Barbara Brandon-Croft
 White Boy (1933–1936) by Garrett Price (US)
 Wildwood (1999–2002) by Dan Wright and Tom Spurgeon (US)
 Williams Cartoons (1928–1942) by Gluyas Williams
 Willie (1948–1963) by Leonard Sansone (US)
 Willie and Joe (1940–1945, special reappearance in 1988 Steve Canyon farewell) by Bill Mauldin (US)
 Willie Dee by Vic Green
 Willie Lumpkin (1959–1961) by Stan Lee and Dan DeCarlo (US)
 Willie Willis (1925–1948) by Robert Quillen
 Willy 'n Ethel (1981– ) by Joe Martin (US)
 Will-Yum (1953–1966) by Dave Gerard
 Win, Lose & Draw (1985– ) by Drew Litton
 Windy Riley (1927–1932) by Ken Kling
 Winky Ryatt (see The Ryatts)
 Winnie the Pooh (1978–1988) by Disney
 Winnie Winkle (1920–1996) by Martin Branner, and later Max VanBibber, Henry Raduta, J.K.S., and Frank Bolle (US)
 Winthrop, first titled Morty Meekle (1956–1993) by Dick Cavalli
 Witty Kitty (1929–1946) by Nina Wilcox Putnam, and later Walt Spouse, L. Frank, and Carl Kuhn
 The Wizard of Id (1964– ) by Johnny Hart and Brant Parker (US)
 Wonder Woman (1945) by Charles Moulton and H.G. Peter (US)
 Woody's World (1963–1979) by John Holm, and later Bill Potter
 Word-a-Day (1946–1979) by Mickey Bach
 Wordsmith (1976–1978) by Tim Menees
 Working Daze (2001– ) by John Zakour; illustrated originally by Andre Noel, later by Kyle Miller, and currently by Scott Roberts
 Working It Out (2001– ) by Charlos Gary (US)
 The World Museum (1937) by Holling C. Holling (US)
 The World of Lily Wong (1986–2001) by Larry Feign (Hong Kong)
 The World of the Bible (1983– ) by C. Cassel and Fred Cassel
 The World's Greatest Superheroes (1978–1985) originally by George Tuska, Vince Colletta and Marty Pasko (US)
 Wright Angles (1977–1990) by Larry Wright (US)
 Wulffmorgenthaler by Mikael Wulff and Anders Morgenthaler (2000– ) (Denmark)

 X 

 Y 
 Yankee Doodles (1973–1977) by Ben Templeton, Don Kracke, and Fred W. Martin (US)
 The Yellow Kid (see Hogan's Alley)
 Yo, Matías (1993– ) by Fernando Sendra (Argentina)
 Yogi Bear (1961–1980) by Hanna-Barbera Productions
 You Know Me Al (1922–1925) by Ring Lardner (US)
 Young Hobby Club by Cappy Dick

 Z 
 Zack Hill (2003– ) by John Deering and John Newcombe (US)
 Zanies (1977– ) by J. Maddox
 Ze General (1945–1955) by Bob Leffingwell
 Zeus! (1979) by Corky Trinidad (US)
 Ziggy (1971– ) by Tom Wilson (US)
 Zimmie (1912–1913)
 Zippy (1976– ) by Bill Griffith (US)
 Zits'' (1997– ) by Jerry Scott and Jim Borgman (US)

References

Sources
 

P-Z